The 2016 Laurence Olivier Awards were held on Sunday 3 April 2016 at the Royal Opera House, London. The 40th anniversary ceremony was hosted by Michael Ball. A highlights show was broadcast on ITV shortly after the live event ended.

Eligibility 
Any new production that opened between 26 February 2015 and 16 February 2016 in a theatre represented in membership of the Society of London Theatre was eligible for consideration, provided it had performed at least 30 performances.

Event calendar
13 February: Voting opens for the Audience Award for Most Popular Show
29 February: Nominations announced by Michael Ball and Imelda Staunton
11 March: Voting closes for the Audience Award
14 March: Nominations announced for the Audience Award
3 April: Award ceremony held

Winners and nominees
The nominations were announced on 29 February 2016 in 26 categories.

Productions with multiple nominations and awards
The following 20 productions, including three operas and one dance, received multiple nominations:

 8: Gypsy
 7: Kinky Boots
 6: Farinelli and the King, Guys and Dolls, The Winter's Tale
 5: Bend It Like Beckham
 4: Hamlet, In the Heights, Mrs Henderson Presents, Nell Gwynn, Oresteia, People, Places and Things
 3: The Father, The Force of Destiny, Hangmen
 2: Cavalleria rusticana / Pagliacci, Les liaisons dangereuses, The Queen of Spades, Seven Brides for Seven Brothers, Woolf Works

The following six productions, including one dance, received multiple awards:

4: Gypsy
3: In the Heights, Kinky Boots
2: Hangmen, People, Places and Things, Woolf Works

See also 
 70th Tony Awards

References

External links
 Olivier Awards official website

Laurence Olivier Awards ceremonies
Laurence Olivier
Laurence Olivier Awards
Laurence Olivier Awards
April 2016 events in the United Kingdom
Royal Opera House